Goniaea is a genus of grasshoppers in the tribe Catantopini from Australia.

Species
Goniaea angustipennis
Goniaea australasiae
Goniaea carinata
Goniaea ensicornis
Goniaea furcifera
Goniaea opomaloides - type species (as Goniaea rugulosa Stål)
Goniaea vocans

References

 
Acrididae genera
Taxa named by Carl Stål